Flowers of Shanghai is a 1998 Taiwanese drama film directed by  Hou Hsiao-hsien starring Tony Leung as a wealthy patron and Hada Michiko, Annie Shizuka Inoh, Shuan Fang, Jack Kao, Carina Lau, Rebecca Pan, Michelle Reis, and Vicky Wei as "flower girls" in four high-end Shanghai brothels. The film is based on the 1892 novel The Sing-song Girls of Shanghai by Han Bangqing. It was voted the third best film of the 1990s in the 1999 Village Voice Film Poll. The film was selected as the Taiwanese entry for the Best Foreign Language Film at the 71st Academy Awards, but was not accepted as a nominee.

Plot
In four elegant brothels, called "Flower Houses", in 1884 Shanghai, several affairs take place. The film follows four men who live for pleasure and pursue a number of courtesans, known as "flower girls".

The courtesans the men patronize are known as Crimson, Jasmin, Jade, Pearl and Emerald. Crimson belongs to the Huifang Enclave brothel, while Jasmin works at the East Hexing Enclave brothel. Jade and her friend Pearl work in the Gongyang Enclave brothel, and Emerald resides in the Shangren Enclave brothel. The relationships between the wealthy patrons and the courtesans are semi-monogamous, frequently lasting many years.

The courtesans are purchased at an early age by the owners of the brothels, known as "aunties". In spite of the luxury and the wealth surrounding them, the graceful, well-bred courtesans live lives of slavery. The girls, especially those with less forgiving aunties, are frequently beaten for misbehavior, although such beatings are not portrayed in the film. Because of oppressive social conventions, the best the courtesans can hope for is to pay off their debts some day (often with the aid of a wealthy patron) or marry into a better social position.

Much of the film concerns the quiet Master Wang, who leaves the courtesan Crimson at the end of their two-and-a-half-year relationship after he is refused her hand in marriage. He falls for the younger courtesan Jasmin, angering Crimson. He offers to settle Crimson's debts as compensation for leaving her, as he is her only client and source of income. Since she is the sole provider for her entire family, Crimson agrees to a settlement. However, Master Wang still has feelings for Crimson. When he finds out she is having an affair with an actor, he launches into a drunken rage. He agrees to marry Jasmin and departs for Guangdong after receiving a promotion. It is later revealed in conversation between other characters that Jasmin had an affair with Wang's nephew, after which he beat her and she attempted suicide. It is said that the nephew was sent away and the quarrel resolved, but Wang is miserable and believes he was betrayed by both Crimson and Jasmin.

Another courtesan, Jade, has been given a promise by her lover, the young and immature Master Zhu, that if they cannot be married together, they will die together. When it is apparent that the marriage will not occur, she gives Zhu opium in an attempt to poison him before attempting to drink opium herself. He realizes that she does not intend to die and spits out the drug as other girls rush in, saving the two. Ultimately, Master Zhu agrees to pay $5,000 for Jade's freedom and $5,000 for a future dowry so Jade can buy out her contract and be married off to someone else.

Emerald yearns for freedom from life in a brothel and is supported by Luo, one of her patrons. As a child, she was bought for $100 by her auntie who insists that freedom costs many times that value ($3,000); the negotiation goes on throughout the film. With the help of Master Hong and Emerald, Luo negotiates a satisfactory price and takes Emerald away from the brothel. The film ends with Crimson and an actor that she had an affair with sitting together as she affectionately prepares a pipe for him, contradicting a conversation she had with Wang about making the actor prepare his own pipe by himself.

Cast

Critical reception
Film critic J. Hoberman, like Jonathan Rosenbaum, called Hou Hsiao-hsien the best director of the '90s and hailed Flowers of Shanghai as one of Hou's three masterpieces from that decade.

Jeffrey Anderson finds the film incredibly beautiful despite the need for "multiple viewings and incredible patience."

While Jeremy Heilman did not want to call it Hou's best film, he considered it his prettiest. Kent Jones called the film innovative.

On review aggregator Rotten Tomatoes, the film has an approval rating of 92% based on 12 reviews. On Metacritic, the film has an average weighted score of 73 out of 100 based on 11 critics, indicating "generally favorable reviews".

Awards
The film won for Best Director and Best Art Director (Wen-Ying Huang) at the Asia-Pacific Film Festival in 1998, and the next year the director won the Golden Crow Pheasant at the International Film Festival of Kerala. It was nominated for the Golden Palm at Cannes but did not win.

See also
Sing-song girls
 List of submissions to the 71st Academy Awards for Best Foreign Language Film
 List of Taiwanese submissions for the Academy Award for Best Foreign Language Film

References

External links 
 
 HK cinemagic entry
Flowers of Shanghai: Inside the Dream an essay by Jean Ma at the Criterion Collection

Taiwanese drama films
1998 films
Films set in the 1880s
Films set in Shanghai
Films directed by Hou Hsiao-hsien
Films about prostitution in China
Films with screenplays by Chu T’ien-wen
Shanghainese-language films
1990s Cantonese-language films